United Nations Security Council resolution 550, adopted on 11 May 1984, after hearing representations from the Republic of Cyprus and reaffirming resolutions 365 (1974), 367 (1975), 541 (1983) and 544 (1983), the council condemned the illegal secessionist activities in the occupied part of the Republic of Cyprus from Turkey, in violation of the previous resolutions.

The council then called on other member states not to recognise the so-called Turkish Republic of Northern Cyprus (TRNC), condemning the exchange of ambassadors between Turkey and Northern Cyprus and considering all attempts to interfere with the United Nations Peacekeeping Force in Cyprus contrary to Security Council resolutions. The resolution also states that it "considers attempts to settle any part of Varosha by people other than its inhabitants as inadmissible and calls for the transfer of this area to the administration of the United Nations". Finally, the resolution also called for the Secretary-General to promote the implementation of the current resolution.

The resolution was adopted by 13 votes to one against (Pakistan) and one abstention from the United States.

See also

 Cyprus dispute
 List of United Nations Security Council Resolutions 501 to 600 (1982–1987)
 United Nations Buffer Zone in Cyprus
 Turkish invasion of Cyprus

References
Text of the Resolution at undocs.org

External links
 

 0550
 0550
May 1984 events
1984 in Cyprus